Roh or ROH may refer to:

 Roh (film), a 2020 Malaysian horror film
 Roh (name), a Korean surname
 Roh, Maré, New Caledonia
 Revoluční odborové hnutí, labour union in Czechoslovakia 1945–1990
 Ring of Honor, American professional wrestling promotion
 Royal Opera House, London, England
 Runs of homozygosity, a technical term used in population genetics
 Formula of a generic alcohol (substituent R, Oxygen, Hydrogen)
 The ISO 639-3 code for the Romansh language

cs:Roh